Pecado Original may refer to:

Pecado Original, a 2017 film directed by Jean Lee starring Maia Nikiphoroff

Pecado Original (album), by Ana Gabriel
Pecado Original, an album by Alexandre Pires
Pecado Original, an album by Pilar Homem de Melo

See also
Pescado Original, an album by Enanitos Verdes